Gholam Reza Sinambari (born in Birjand, Iran) is an Iranian engineer and university professor.

He moved to Germany and studied there. He is a professor at the Department of Environmental Engineering at the Fachhochschule Bingen (Germany) - University of Applied Sciences.

References

Iranian emigrants to Germany
Iranian engineers
Living people
Academic staff of the University of Applied Sciences Bingen
Year of birth missing (living people)